Early to Bed is a 1936 American comedy film directed by Norman Z. McLeod, written by Arthur Kober, Lucien Littlefield, S. J. Perelman and Chandler Sprague, and starring Mary Boland, Charlie Ruggles, George Barbier, Gail Patrick, Robert McWade and Lucien Littlefield. It was released on June 25, 1936, by Paramount Pictures.

Plot

Chester Beatty (Ruggles) and Tessie Weeks (Boland) have been engaged for 5 years and going together for 15 years before that. Chester is reluctant to burden Tessie with marriage because of his secret problem. He is a sleepwalker. When Tessie finally does rope Chester into marriage, he cannot get time off from his boss of 26 years, Mr. Frisbee (McWade). To solve the problem, Chester sets out to impress his boss by securing a big sales contract of glass eyes. He takes Tessie and follows the rich doll company owner Horace B. Stanton (Barbier) to a lakeside resort and befriends him. However, his sleepwalking make him a prime suspect in a theft/murder case.

Cast 
Mary Boland as Tessie Weeks
Charlie Ruggles as Chester Beatty
George Barbier as Horace Stanton
Gail Patrick as Grace Stanton
Robert McWade as Burgess Frisbie
Lucien Littlefield as Mr. O'Leary
Colin Tapley as Doctor Vernon
Helen Flint as Mrs. Duvall
Rae Daggett as Miss Benson
Sidney Blackmer as Rex Daniels
Arthur Hoyt as Smithers
Billy Gilbert as Burger

Reception 
TV Guide described the film as "silly fun, but Ruggles and Boland make a good team."

References

External links 
 

1936 films
American black-and-white films
Films about sleep disorders
Films directed by Norman Z. McLeod
Paramount Pictures films
American comedy films
1936 comedy films
1930s English-language films
1930s American films